Xiaokai Yang (born as Yang Xiguang; Simplified Chinese: 杨小凯; 6 October 1948 – 7 July 2004) was a Chinese-Australian economist. He was one of the world's pre-eminent theorists in economic analysis, and an influential campaigner for democracy in China.

Biography

Early life 
Yang was born in China, the son of Chinese Communist Party officials. His parents' status meant that he initially had a privileged life, receiving an excellent education by Chinese standards at the time.

Life under the Maoist government 
His life changed dramatically in the early days of the Cultural Revolution. Yang was a Red Guard in Hunan who was part of the Rebel faction Shengwulian. On behalf of the group, Yang wrote what probably become the most influential article of the Cultural Revolution. He published a political treatise entitled "Whither China?", which was highly critical of Mao Zedong's communist regime from a farther left perspective.

Yang contended that the essential conflict in China was between the new "red capitalist class", consisting of CCP cadres and their families, and the masses of the Chinese people. This was a shocking and daring deviation from the orthodox Maoist view that conflict in China was essentially between Mao and his enemies. Yang's essay was read by hundreds of thousands of Chinese during the Cultural Revolution. It could not be read openly, and was passed secretly between trusted friends, provoking lively debate across China. So great was his influence that some members of the 1980s Democracy Movement in China viewed Yang Xiaokai as "the forerunner of the Thinking Generation".

Imprisonment and release 
Yang was arrested and sent to prison for 10 years. At one point, Yang learned that he was scheduled to be executed, though this never eventuated. Nevertheless, distraught by her son's treatment, Yang's mother, Chen Su, committed suicide.

While in prison, Yang managed to learn English and calculus. He learnt from and deeply admired a fellow prisoner who happened to be a mathematics professor and a devout Christian; but Yang did not convert yet at that time. When he was released, Xiguang (his original name from birth) changed his name to Xiaokai Yang (his childhood nickname), so that he could find a job.

Professional career 
Yang gained admission to the Institute of Economics at the Chinese Academy of Social Sciences with the help of economist Yu Guangyuan, then the deputy director of the Academy. Yu admitted him as a student of mathematical economics. He later joined Hunan University and published two highly influential books on economics. He then studied at Princeton University, where he obtained a Ph.D. in economics.

Following his study at Princeton, Yang accepted a postdoctoral fellowship at Yale University. In 1988, he moved to Australia and took up a position as lecturer at Monash University. He quickly gained widespread international attention, publishing numerous English-language articles and books. He was made senior lecturer in 1989, reader in 1993, and was awarded a personal chair in Economics in 2000. In 1993, he was elected fellow of the Australian Academy of Social Sciences. He was twice nominated for the Nobel Prize in Economics (2002 and 2003).

He collaborated with some of the world's leading economists, including Yew-Kwang Ng and Jeffrey Sachs, the latter of whom stated that "Yang is one of the world's most penetrating and exacting economic theorists, and one of the most creative minds in the economics profession". In 2002, Nobel Prize Winner Professor James M. Buchanan said that: "In my view, the most important and exciting research in economics in the world is done at Monash, and it is done by Xiaokai Yang."

Yang was a neoclassical economist. He is praised by his colleagues for having cleared up many unhelpful digressions in economic writing, and returning the discipline to the fundamental insights of Adam Smith. His work is founded on the ideal that all persons (potential traders) are equal in all relevant respects. He moved from this to develop an extensive explanatory apparatus. His work encompasses equilibria that involve more behavioral adjustments than those defined in orthodox neoclassical models of general equilibrium. According to Buchanan, this approach has major implications for a wide range of issues in economics, such as globalisation, outsourcing, as well as interoccupational and locational mobility.

Illness and religious conversion 
Yang was diagnosed with lung cancer in September 2001. Doctors predicted that it would kill him soon, but he lived more years than initially expected. In 2002, Yang converted to Christianity and made it public, becoming a member of the Anglican Church. Six months later, he was baptized and wrote a second testimony about his new belief in The Bible.

He died on 7 July 2004, survived by his wife, Xiaojuan; and three children, Xiaoxi, James, and Edward. His eventful life is described in his memoir, Captive Spirits: Prisoners of the Cultural Revolution.

Legacy  
Yang's major contribution at the time of his death was the development of infra-marginal economics, which are those discrete decisions that dictate future path dependencies.

He was a prolific author in economics, but Yang simultaneously wrote a large body of influential political essays in Chinese, including a best-selling book. He championed democracy, decentralization of Chinese political power, and privatization of the Chinese economy. When he died, Southern Weekend, the most influential reformist magazine in China, published a long obituary, praising Yang, and discussing the pervasive impact of his writings.

References

Further reading 
 Klaus Mehnert, 1969. Peking and the New Left at Home and Abroad, Berkeley: Center for Chinese Studies. (This book focuses almost entirely on Yang's writings of the Cultural Revolution.)
 Xiaokai Yang and Jeff Borland, 1991. "A Microeconomic Mechanism for Economic Growth," Journal of Political Economy, 99(3), p p. 460-482.
 Xiaokai Yang and Yew-Kwang Ng, 1993. Specialization and Economic Organization: A New Classical Microeconomic Framework, North Holland.
 Xiaokai Yang, 1994. "Endogenous vs. Exogenous Comparative Advantage and Economies of Specialization vs. Economies of Scale," Journal of Economics, 60(1), p p. 29-54.
 Xiaokai Yang and Robert Rice, 1994. "An Equilibrium Model Endogenizing the Emergence of a Dual Structure between the Urban and Rural Sectors," Journal of Urban Economics, 35(3), p p. 346-368.
 Xiaokai Yang and Susan McFadden, 1997. Captive Spirits: Prisoners of the Cultural Revolution, Oxford University Press. (Xiaokai Yang's memoirs) Review fragment.
 Xiaokai Yang, 2001. Economics: New Classical versus Neoclassical Frameworks, New York: Blackwell,  Description and chapter -preview links. (A comprehensive treatise of Xiaokai Yang's economic thought.)
 Xiaokai Yang et al., ed., 2005, An Inframarginal Approach to Trade Theory, v. 1, World Scientific. Description and scrollable contents link. Papers include 14 (co-)authored by Yang.
 Yew-Kwang Ng and Guang-Zhen Sun, ed., 2006. Division of Labour and Transaction Costs, 1(2). (This is a special issue of this journal in memory of Xiaokai Yang.)

1948 births
2004 deaths
Economists from Hunan
Australian economists
Chinese emigrants to Australia
Academic staff of Monash University
Hunan University alumni
Princeton University alumni
Chinese Christians
Australian Christians
Fellows of the Academy of the Social Sciences in Australia
Deaths from lung cancer
Deaths from cancer in Victoria (Australia)
People from Changsha
Educators from Hunan